LUKOIL Neftohim Burgas, based in Burgas, Bulgaria, is the largest oil refinery in the Balkans and the largest industrial enterprise in Bulgaria.

Owned by Russian oil giant LUKOIL, the refinery has the biggest contribution among the privately owned enterprises to the country's GDP and to the state budget revenues. LUKOIL Neftohim Burgas is the leading producer and supplier of liquid fuels, petrochemicals and polymers for Bulgaria and the region and one of the leading companies in its field in Europe.

In November 2021, Competition commission of Bulgaria accused Bulgarian branch of “Lukoil” of abuse of market dominance, due to, despite company`s biggest warehouse and logistics infrastructure on local oil market, Lukoil`s withdrawal to stock oil from other companies at Lukoil taxable warehouses, switched to main oil terminals in Bulgaria as well as to provide access to pipes for transportation of imported oil. In return, “LUKOIL Neftohim Burgas” has brought into focus, that any of the rules on Bulgarian oil market weren`t violated by the company.
In 2022, it announced that it could only work with Russian oil grade "Ural". After he managed to avoid the embargo on Russian oil, he produces his fuel at several times lower cost, which he sells now at market prices. The refinery is also under investigation for tax evasion and financial manipulation.

Products

Fuels 
LUKOIL Neftohim Burgas AD produces the following petrochemical products:
 Motor gasoline А-92 /export outside the EU/
 Motor gasoline А-95 under EN-228 /Euro-5/
 Motor gasoline А-98 under EN-228 /Euro-5/
 Low octane gasoline /LOG/
 Diesel fuel without bio component under EN-590 /Euro-5/
 Diesel fuel with bio component B4 under EN-590 /Euro-5/
 Gas oil 0,1% S
 Jet fuel А-1
 Fuel oil
 Bitumen
 Vacuum residue

Other products 
 Propane-butane under EN-589.
 Process Sulfur (palletized and "lumps").

Polymers 
 Polypropylene

Workplace
LUKOIL Neftohim Burgas employs 1,348 people (2019), the average salary being the highest among industrial companies in the country. The refinery has operated entirely on self-produced electric power since 23 May 2000 and uses water from the nearby Lake Mandrensko.

See also 

Plama Pleven Refinery

References

External links
 LUKOIL Bulgaria

Lukoil
Petrochemical companies
Oil and gas companies of Bulgaria
Oil refineries in Bulgaria
Buildings and structures in Burgas
Black Sea energy
Bulgaria–Soviet Union relations